Dario Hernan Drudi (born 23 April 1987) is an Argentine football manager.

Career
Drudi lived in Spain from age 15 and the next year joined the youth team of CF Gandía. But later he decided to concentrate on a coaching career. He started his managing career in Villarreal sportive school as an assistant coach, working here from 2011 until June 2016. He was part of the manager Marcelino García Toral team.

In July 2016, he signed a contract with the Ukrainian Premier League's FC Zirka Kropyvnytskyi and worked as manager of the youth reserves team. In August 2016, the main coach Serhiy Lavrynenko left Zirka, and on 18 August 2016 Dario Drudi was named as a caretaker manager of the Ukrainian team. He worked in the club until 15 November 2016.

On 2 August 2019 Turki Al-Sheikh became the owner of UD Almería and named Drudi as sporting director, replacing Miguel Ángel Corona,

References

External links
Profile at Soccerway
Profile at Footballfacts (rus)
Dario Hernan Drudi at Footballdatabase

1987 births
Living people
Argentine people of Italian descent
Argentine football managers
Argentine expatriate football managers
FC Zirka Kropyvnytskyi managers
Ukrainian Premier League managers
Expatriate football managers in Ukraine
Argentine expatriate sportspeople in Ukraine
Expatriate football managers in Spain
Argentine expatriate sportspeople in Spain
Expatriate football managers in Monaco
Argentine expatriate sportspeople in Monaco
AS Monaco FC non-playing staff
FC Karpaty Lviv managers
Unión San Felipe managers